Cyanophlebia is a genus of moths in the family Sesiidae.

Species
Cyanophlebia mandarina  Arita & Gorbunov, 2001

References

Sesiidae